Chaouki Dries (born 16 January 1981) is an Algerian rower. He competed in the men's single sculls event at the 2008 Summer Olympics.

References

External links
 

1981 births
Living people
Algerian male rowers
Olympic rowers of Algeria
Rowers at the 2008 Summer Olympics
People from Annaba
21st-century Algerian people